Dharker is an Indian-Pakistan surname. Notable people with the surname include:

 Imtiaz Dharker (born 1954), Pakistani-British poet and filmmaker
 Ayesha Dharker (born 1977), British-Indian actress and daughter of Imtiaz Dharker

See also
 Darker (disambiguation)

Indian surnames